This is a list of the Superior Court districts in the state of Washington. There are a total of 32 Superior Court districts for the 39 counties of Washington, with most districts consisting of a single county. While each county has a Superior Court, some of the less populated counties are grouped into a single district, sharing a single judge and administration. The judge for these multi-county districts rotates between the counties as needed, with each County Superior Court having its own courtroom and staff.

Superior Court Districts 
 Adams County Superior Court District
 Asotin/Columbia/Garfield Superior Court District
 Benton/Franklin Superior Court District
 Chelan County Superior Court District
 Clallam County Superior Court District
 Clark County Superior Court District
 Cowlitz County Superior Court District
 Douglas County Superior Court District
 Ferry/Pend Oreille/Stevens Superior Court District
 Grant County Superior Court District
 Grays Harbor County Superior Court District
 Island County Superior Court District
 Jefferson County Superior Court District
 King County Superior Court District
 Kitsap County Superior Court District
 Kittitas County Superior Court District
 Klickitat/Skamania Superior Court District
 Lewis County Superior Court District
 Lincoln County Superior Court District
 Mason County Superior Court District
 Okanogan County Superior Court District
 Pacific/Wahkiakum Superior Court District
 Pierce County Superior Court District
 San Juan County Superior Court District
 Skagit County Superior Court District
 Snohomish County Superior Court District
 Spokane County Superior Court District
 Thurston County Superior Court District
 Walla Walla County Superior Court District
 Whatcom County Superior Court District
 Whitman County Superior Court District
 Yakima County Superior Court District

See also 
 Washington court system

References 

 
Courts in the United States